Heinz Schaub (born 22 October 1928) was a Swiss diver. He competed in two events at the 1952 Summer Olympics.

References

External links
 

1928 births
Possibly living people
Swiss male divers
Olympic divers of Switzerland
Divers at the 1952 Summer Olympics
Place of birth missing (living people)